Clarence Island (Spanish: Isla Clarence) is an island in the  Magallanes Region. It belongs to the Tierra del Fuego archipelago and to the municipality of Punta Arenas. It is located just south of Brunswick Peninsula (on the south side of Froward Reach).

Clarence Island extends from Magdalena Channel and Cockburn Channel to Bárbara Channel; and the whole length of its northern coast is indented by sounds stretching deeply into the island.

Literature
 United States Hydrographic Office, South America Pilot (1916)

Islands of Tierra del Fuego